State Highway 23 (SH 23) is a State Highway in Kerala, India that starts in  Shoranur Railway Station and ends by joining National Highway 213 at Perinthalmanna. The highway is 39.3 km long.

The Route Map 
SH 23 Shornur Perinthalmanna Highway - Kulappuly - Vadanamkurussy - Ongallur - Manjalungal - Manappadi - Pattambi Joins SH 39

Districts connected by State Highway 
Palakkad and Malappuram

Townships on the State Highway 
Shournur, Pattambi and Perinthalmanna

See also 
 Roads in Kerala
 List of State Highways in Kerala

References 

State Highways in Kerala
Roads in Malappuram district
Roads in Palakkad district